Palaquium maingayi is a species of plant in the family Sapotaceae. It is native to Peninsular Malaysia, Borneo and Thailand.

References

maingayi
Flora of Peninsular Malaysia
Flora of Borneo
Flora of Thailand
Taxonomy articles created by Polbot